The study of Roman sculpture is complicated by its relation to Greek sculpture. Many examples of even the most famous Greek sculptures, such as the Apollo Belvedere and Barberini Faun, are known only from Roman Imperial or Hellenistic "copies". At one time, this imitation was taken by art historians as indicating a narrowness of the Roman artistic imagination, but, in the late 20th century, Roman art began to be reevaluated on its own terms: some impressions of the nature of Greek sculpture may in fact be based on Roman artistry.

The strengths of Roman sculpture are in portraiture, where they were less concerned with the ideal than the Greeks or Ancient Egyptians, and produced very characterful works, and in narrative relief scenes.  Examples of Roman sculpture are abundantly preserved, in total contrast to Roman painting, which was very widely practiced but has almost all been lost. Latin and some Greek authors, particularly Pliny the Elder in Book 34 of his Natural History, describe statues, and a few of these descriptions match extant works. While a great deal of Roman sculpture, especially in stone, survives more or less intact, it is often damaged or fragmentary; life-size bronze statues are much more rare as most have been recycled for their metal.

Most statues were actually far more lifelike and often brightly colored when originally created; the raw stone surfaces found today is due to the pigment being lost over the centuries.

Development

Early Roman art was influenced by the art of Greece and that of the neighbouring Etruscans, themselves greatly influenced by their Greek trading partners. An Etruscan speciality was near life size tomb effigies in terracotta, usually lying on top of a sarcophagus lid propped up on one elbow in the pose of a diner in that period. As the expanding Roman Republic began to conquer Greek territory, at first in Southern Italy and then the entire Hellenistic world except for the Parthian far east, official and patrician sculpture became largely an extension of the Hellenistic style, from which specifically Roman elements are hard to disentangle, especially as so much Greek sculpture survives only in copies of the Roman period. By the 2nd century BCE, "most of the sculptors working at Rome" were Greek, often enslaved in conquests such as that of Corinth (146 BCE), and sculptors continued to be mostly Greeks, often slaves, whose names are very rarely recorded. Sculpting was not considered a profession by Romans — at most, it was accepted as a hobby. Vast numbers of Greek statues were imported to Rome, whether as booty or the result of extortion or commerce, and temples were often decorated with re-used Greek works.

A native Italian style can be seen in the tomb monuments of prosperous middle-class Romans, which very often featured portrait busts, and portraiture is arguably the main strength of Roman sculpture. There are no survivals from the tradition of masks of ancestors that were worn in processions at the funerals of the great families and otherwise displayed in the home, but many of the busts that survive must represent ancestral figures, perhaps from the large family tombs like the Tomb of the Scipios or the later mausolea outside the city. The famous "Capitoline Brutus", a bronze head supposedly of Lucius Junius Brutus is very variously dated, but taken as a very rare survival of Italic style under the Republic, in the preferred medium of bronze. Similarly stern and forceful heads are seen in the coins of the consuls, and in the Imperial period coins as well as busts sent around the Empire to be placed in the basilicas of provincial cities were the main visual form of imperial propaganda; even Londinium had a near-colossal statue of Nero, though far smaller than the 30-metre-high Colossus of Nero in Rome, now lost.  The Tomb of Eurysaces the Baker, a successful freedman (c. 50–20 BC) has a frieze that is an unusually large example of the "plebeian" style. 

The Romans did not generally attempt to compete with free-standing Greek works of heroic exploits from history or mythology, but from early on produced historical works in relief, culminating in the great Roman triumphal columns with continuous narrative reliefs winding around them, of which those commemorating Trajan (CE 113) and Marcus Aurelius (by 193) survive in Rome, where the Ara Pacis ("Altar of Peace", 13 BCE) represents the official Greco-Roman style at its most classical and refined.  Among other major examples are the earlier re-used reliefs on the Arch of Constantine and the base of the Column of Antoninus Pius (161), Campana reliefs were cheaper pottery versions of marble reliefs and the taste for relief was from the imperial period expanded to the sarcophagus.

All forms of luxury small sculpture continued to be patronized, and quality could be extremely high, as in the silver Warren Cup, glass Lycurgus Cup, and large cameos like the Gemma Augustea, Gonzaga Cameo and the "Great Cameo of France".  For a much wider section of the population, moulded relief decoration of pottery vessels and small figurines were produced in great quantity and often considerable quality.

After moving through a late 2nd century "baroque" phase, in the 3rd century, Roman art largely abandoned, or simply became unable to produce, sculpture in the classical tradition, a change whose causes remain much discussed. Even the most important imperial monuments now showed stumpy, large-eyed figures in a harsh frontal style, in simple compositions emphasizing power at the expense of grace.  The contrast is famously illustrated in the Arch of Constantine of 315 in Rome, which combines sections in the new style with roundels in the earlier full Greco-Roman style taken from elsewhere, and the Four Tetrarchs (c. 305) from the new capital of Constantinople, now in Venice. Ernst Kitzinger found in both monuments the same "stubby proportions, angular movements, an ordering of parts through symmetry and repetition and a rendering of features and drapery folds through incisions rather than modelling... The hallmark of the style wherever it appears consists of an emphatic hardness, heaviness and angularity — in short, an almost complete rejection of the classical tradition".

This revolution in style shortly preceded the period in which Christianity was adopted by the Roman state and the great majority of the people, leading to the end of large religious sculpture, with large statues now only used for emperors, as in the famous fragments of a colossal acrolithic statue of Constantine, and the 4th or 5th century Colossus of Barletta.  However rich Christians continued to commission reliefs for sarcophagi, as in the Sarcophagus of Junius Bassus, and very small sculpture, especially in ivory, was continued by Christians, building on the style of the consular diptych.

Portraiture

Portraiture is a dominant genre of Roman sculpture, growing perhaps from the traditional Roman emphasis on family and ancestors; the entrance hall (atrium) of a Roman elite house displayed ancestral portrait busts. During the Roman Republic, it was considered a sign of character not to gloss over physical imperfections, and to depict men in particular as rugged and unconcerned with vanity: the portrait was a map of experience. During the Imperial era, more idealized statues of Roman emperors became ubiquitous, particularly in connection with the state religion of Rome. Tombstones of even the modestly rich middle class sometimes exhibit portraits of the otherwise unknown deceased carved in relief.

Among the many museums with examples of Roman portrait sculpture, the collections of the Metropolitan Museum of Art in New York and the British Museum in London are especially noteworthy.

Religious and funerary art

Religious art was also a major form of Roman sculpture. A central feature of a Roman temple was the cult statue of the deity, who was regarded as "housed" there (see aedes). Although images of deities were also displayed in private gardens and parks, the most magnificent of the surviving statues appear to have been cult images. Roman altars were usually rather modest and plain, but some Imperial examples are modeled after Greek practice with elaborate reliefs, most famously the Ara Pacis, which has been called "the most representative work of Augustan art." Small bronze statuettes and ceramic figurines, executed with varying degrees of artistic competence, are plentiful in the archaeological record, particularly in the provinces, and indicate that these were a continual presence in the lives of Romans, whether for votives or for private devotional display at home or in neighborhood shrines.  These typically show more regional variation in style than large and more official works, and also stylistic preferences between different classes.

Roman marble sarcophagi mostly date from the 2nd to the 4th century CE, after a change in Roman burial customs from cremation to inhumation, and were mostly made in a few major cities, including Rome and Athens, which exported them to other cities. Elsewhere the stela gravestone remained more common.  They were always a very expensive form reserved for the elite, and especially so in the relatively few very elaborately carved examples; most were always relatively plain, with inscriptions, or symbols such as garlands.  Sarcophagi divide into a number of styles, by the producing area. "Roman" ones were made to rest against a wall, and one side was left uncarved, while "Attic" and other types were carved on all four sides; but the short sides were generally less elaborately decorated in both types.

The time taken to make them encouraged the use of standard subjects, to which inscriptions might be added to personalize them, and portraits of the deceased were slow to appear.  The sarcophagi offer examples of intricate reliefs that depict scenes often based on Greek and Roman mythology or mystery religions that offered personal salvation, and allegorical representations. Roman funerary art also offers a variety of scenes from everyday life, such as game-playing, hunting, and military endeavors.

Early Christian art quickly adopted the sarcophagus, and they are the most common form of early Christian sculpture, progressing from simple examples with symbols to elaborate fronts, often with small scenes of the Life of Christ in two rows within an architectural framework. The Sarcophagus of Junius Bassus (c. 359) is of this type, and the earlier Dogmatic Sarcophagus rather simpler. The huge porphyry Sarcophagi of Helena and Constantina are grand Imperial examples.

Scenes from Roman sarcophagi

Gardens and baths

A number of well-known large stone vases sculpted in relief from the Imperial period were apparently mostly used as garden ornaments; indeed many statues were also placed in gardens, both public and private.  Sculptures recovered from the site of the Gardens of Sallust, opened to the public by Tiberius, include:

the Obelisco Sallustiano, a Roman copy of an Egyptian obelisk which now stands in front of the Trinità dei Monti church above the Piazza di Spagna at the top of the Spanish Steps
the Borghese Vase, discovered there in the 16th century.
the sculptures known as the Dying Gaul and the Gaul Killing Himself and His Wife, marble copies of parts a famous Hellenistic group in bronze commissioned for Pergamon in about 228 BC.
the Ludovisi Throne (probably an authentic Greek piece in the Severe style), found in 1887, and the Boston Throne, found in 1894.
the Crouching Amazon, found in 1888 near the via Boncompagni, about twenty-five meters from the via Quintino Sella (Museo Conservatori).

Roman baths were another site for sculpture; among the well-known pieces recovered from the Baths of Caracalla are the Farnese Bull and Farnese Hercules and larger-than-life-sized early 3rd century patriotic figures somewhat reminiscent of Soviet Social Realist works (now in the Museo di Capodimonte, Naples).

Found in the Gardens of Sallust and the Gardens of Maecenas:

Technology

Scenes shown on reliefs such as that of Trajan's column and those shown on sarcophogi reveal images of Roman technology now long lost, such as ballistae and the use of waterwheel-driven saws for cutting stone. The latter was only recently discovered at Hieropolis and commemorates the miller who used the machine. Other reliefs show harvesting machines, much as they were described by Pliny the Elder in his Naturalis Historia.

Architecture
Compared to the Greeks, the Romans made less use of stone sculpture on buildings, apparently having few friezes with figures.  Important pediments, such as the Pantheon for example, originally had sculpture, but hardly any have survived. Terracotta relief panels called Campana reliefs have survived in good numbers.  These were used to decorate interior walls, in strips.

The architectural writer Vitruvius is oddly reticent on the architectural use of sculpture, mentioning only a few examples, though he says that an architect should be able to explain the meaning of architectural ornament and gives as an example the use of caryatids.

See also 
 Ancient Roman pottery
 Classical sculpture
 Gallo-Roman art
 History of sculpture
 Roman art
 Roman engineering
 Roman technology

Notes

References
Elsner, Jas, "Style" in Critical Terms for Art History, Nelson, Robert S. and Shiff, Richard, 2nd Edn. 2010, University of Chicago Press, 9780226571690, google books
 Henig, Martin (ed, Ch 3, "Sculpture" by Anthony Bonanno), A Handbook of Roman Art, Phaidon, 1983, 
 Kitzinger, Ernst, Byzantine art in the making: main lines of stylistic development in Mediterranean art, 3rd–7th century, 1977, Faber & Faber,  (US: Cambridge UP, 1977)
 Strong, Donald, et al., Roman Art, 1995 (2nd edn.), Yale University Press (Penguin/Yale History of Art), 
 Williams, Dyfri. Masterpieces of Classical Art, 2009, British Museum Press,

Further reading 

Conlin, Diane Atnally. The Artists of the Ara Pacis: The Process of Hellenization In Roman Relief Sculpture. Chapel Hill: University of North Carolina Press, 1997.
Fejfer, Jane. Roman Portraits In Context. Berlin: De Gruyter, 2008.
Flower, Harriet I. Ancestor Masks and Aristocratic Power In Roman Culture. Oxford: Clarendon Press, 1996.
Gruen, Erich S. Culture and National Identity In Republican Rome. Ithaca: Cornell University Press, 1992.
Hallett, Christopher H. The Roman Nude: Heroic Portrait Statuary 200 B.C.-A.D. 300. Oxford: Oxford University Press, 2005.
Kleiner, Diana E. E. Roman Group Portraiture: The Funerary Reliefs of the Late Republic and Early Empire. New York: Garland Pub., 1977.
--. Roman Sculpture. New Haven: Yale University Press, 1992.
Koortbojian, Michael. Myth, Meaning, and Memory On Roman Sarcophagi. Berkeley: University of California Press, 1995.
Kousser, Rachel Meredith. Hellenistic and Roman Ideal Sculpture: The Allure of the Classical. Cambridge: Cambridge University Press, 2008.
Kristensen, Troels Myrup, and Lea Margaret Stirling. The Afterlife of Greek and Roman Sculpture: Late Antique Responses and Practices. Ann Arbor: University of Michigan Press, 2016.
Mattusch, Carol A. The Villa dei Papiri at Herculaneum: Life and Afterlife of a Sculptural Collection. Los Angeles: J. Paul Getty Museum, 2005.
Ryberg, Inez Scott. Rites of the State Religion in Roman Art. Rome: American Academy in Rome, 1955.
Sobocinski, Melanie Grunow, Elise A. Friedland, and Elaine K. Gazda. The Oxford Handbook of Roman Sculpture. New York: Oxford University Press, 2015.
Stewart, Peter. The Social History of Roman Art. Cambridge: Cambridge University Press, 2008.
Varner, Eric R. Mutilation and Transformation: Damnatio Memoriae and Roman Imperial Portraiture. Leiden: Brill, 2004.

External links 

 "Roman art: Sculpture". The Columbia Electronic Encyclopedia, 6th edition. © 2006. Columbia University Press / Infoplease. Visited May 28, 2006.
 The Gallery of Ancient Art: Roman sculpture
 Comprehensive visual documentation of Ara Pacis Sculpture".